Brioni Agreement may refer to:
Brioni Agreement (1942) concluded between Croatia, Germany, Italy and Hungary on 10 August 1942, concerning reorganisation of the Danube–Sava–Adriatic Railway Company
Brioni Declaration (1956), also known as Brioni Agreement, issued by heads of governments of India, Egypt and Yugoslavia in 1956, forming a basis for the Non-Aligned Movement
Brioni Agreement or Brioni Declaration concluded between leaderships of Croatia, Slovenia and Yugoslavia on 7 July 1991, sponsored by the European Community